John Sowerby may refer to:

John Edward Sowerby (1825–1870), English botanist, publisher, and illustrator
John George Sowerby (1850–1914), English painter, glass maker, and children's book illustrator